"Figures" is a song by Canadian singer Jessie Reyez from her debut extended play Kiddo (2017). It was released as a single by FMLY on August 26, 2016 and was later added to her debut studio album Before Love Came to Kill Us (2020). The song was written by Reyez and Shy Carter alongside Björn Djupström and Tobias Frelin, the members of songwriting duo Priest and the Beast, who also produced it.

Commercial performance
"Figures" was a minor hit in Canada where it peaked at 58 on the Canadian Hot 100. The song received a triple platinum certification from Music Canada for selling 240,000 track-equivalent units.

In the US, the song peaked at number 7 on the R&B Digital Song Sales chart and at 32 on the Rhythmic Songs chart. It received a platinum certification from the Recording Industry Association of America (RIAA) for selling one million track-equivalent units.

Music video
The music video for "Figures" was published on YouTube on August 24, 2016. It is a minimal video in which Reyez sings the song while she is sitting on a chair.

Live performances
On June 18, 2017, Reyez performed "Figures" on the 2017 iHeartRadio Much Music Video Awards Red Carpet pre-show. She again performed the song a week later at the 2017 BET Awards.

Reyez made her late-night TV debut with her performance of "Figures" on The Tonight Show Starring Jimmy Fallon on August 9, 2017. In November 2017, she performed both "Gatekeeper" and "Figures" on Late Night with Seth Meyers, with the latter being released as a web exclusive.

A live performance of "Figures" recorded for Vevo in a motel parking lot was published on Reyez's YouTube channel on March 30, 2020. The singer played the guitar alongside a group of string players.

Personnel
Credits adapted from Tidal.
 Priest and the Beast – producer, recording engineer
 Dustin Richardson – mix engineer
 Cole Nystrom – mixer

Charts

Certifications

Figures, a Reprise

Background
Daniel Caesar asked Jessie Reyez to join him on stage for one of five sold-out shows he played in Toronto. Reyez wanted to sing her song "Figures" and decided to include Caesar's band to her performance. She performed half of the song solo while playing the guitar, and the other half was performed by the band. She later asked Caesar to rework the song with her and "Figures, a Reprise" was done a few weeks later.

Release and promotion
On March 25, 2018, Reyez shared a screenshot of a chat with Daniel Caesar through her Instagram story. Later that night, they performed "Figures, a Reprise" together during the Juno Awards of 2018. The song was released on digital platforms after their performance.

Personnel
Credits adapted from Tidal.
 Jordan Evans – producer
 Matthew Burnett – producer, drums
 Ian Culley – guitar
 Saya Gray – bass
 Riley Bell – mixer, recording engineer

References

2018 songs
2018 singles
Jessie Reyez songs
Daniel Caesar songs
Songs written by Björn Djupström
Songs written by Daniel Caesar
Songs written by Jessie Reyez
Songs written by Matthew Burnett
Songs written by Shy Carter
Soul ballads